George Habib Antonius, CBE (hon.) (October 9, 1891May 21, 1942) was a Lebanese author and diplomat who settled in Jerusalem. He was one of the first historians of Arab nationalism. Born in Deir al Qamar to a Lebanese Eastern Orthodox Christian family, he served as a civil servant in the British Mandate of Palestine.  His 1938 book The Arab Awakening generated an ongoing debate over such issues as the origins of Arab nationalism, the significance of the Arab Revolt of 1916, and the machinations behind the post-World War I political settlement in West Asia and North Africa.

Philosophy
Antonius traced Arab nationalism to the reign of Mehmet Ali Pasha in Egypt.  He argued that the Arab nation (which consists of racial and cultural-linguistic elements) has been "dormant" for centuries, and that Protestant missionaries from United States had a specific role in the renewal and "awakening" of the Arabic as a national language.  He saw the role of the Syrian Protestant College as central to this development, although he notes that later on, by the end of the 19th century, that role has diminished, since the college initiated instruction in English. By then the torch of the movement had been passed to Arab intellectuals residing in Greater Syria and in Europe and to Arab officers in the Ottoman army that formed a secret society to ultimately promote Arab nationalist interests. These officers proved particularly useful later during World War I after the leadership of the movement openly shifted allegiance to support the Entente. Other than tracing the birth of the Arab national movement, Antonius also argued that it was Great Britain that dishonored its prior commitments to the Arabs, and instead pursued its own colonial interests at the expense of what Antonius calls the "true will of the people," namely unity and independence of the would-be Arab state.

Career

Antonius graduated from Cambridge University and joined the newly formed British Mandate Administration in Palestine as the deputy in the Education Department. His wife, Katy, was a daughter of Faris Nimr Pasha, a wealthy Lebanese Christian and cultural activist. Antonius had a difficult relationship with the British. Despite his senior position he and his wife were refused membership to the Jerusalem sports club which had a "No Natives" policy.

In 1925, Antonius joined Gilbert Clayton in the newly formed Saudi Arabia, as his translator and advisor in the negotiations to agree on the boundaries of Saudi Arabia with Iraq, Transjordan and Yemen.

He resigned his position in 1930 to join the Institute of Current World Affairs in New York City. He was secretary general to the Arab Delegation to the London Conference (1939).

An annual lecture is given in his memory at St Antony's College, Oxford.

Personal life
Antonius was the son-in-law of Faris Nimr who was a Lebanese journalist and founder of the newspaper Al Muqattam.

Gallery

References

Sources

External links
 Antonius, George. The Arab awakening : the story of the Arab national movement.  Philadelphia : J.B. Lippincott, 1939.
Kramer, Martin (1996) Ambition, Arabism, and George Antonius in Arab Awakening and Islamic Revival: The Politics of Ideas in the Middle East, ed. Martin Kramer (New Brunswick: Transaction, 1996), 112–23.
Documents of Western Betrayal and Arab Opposition from The Arab Awakening

People from Chouf District
Greek Orthodox Christians from Lebanon
Lebanese emigrants to Mandatory Palestine
20th-century Lebanese historians
Historians of the Middle East
Honorary Commanders of the Order of the British Empire
1891 births
1941 deaths
Alumni of King's College, Cambridge
Lebanese Arab nationalists